Campanula punctata, the spotted bellflower, is a herbaceous perennial flowering plant in the bellflower family. It has leaves and stems which fall down at the end of the blooming season.

Campanula is a Latin word that means "bell".
Punkta is said to have the meaning of "with dots" and "joining a group".

Distribution
Campanula punctata　　It is a perennial herb that has been widely is distributed from flatlands to mountains in various parts of Japan since ancient times.
The Japanese name is hotarubukuro(ホタルブクロ(蛍袋)), also known as chochinbana(チョウチンバナ) and tokkanbana(トッカンバナ).

Gardening variety name Campanula Takeshimana'Beautiful Trust'
Campanula takesimana ‘Beautiful Trust’ is a cultivated cultivar with white flowers and a torn bag. The leaves are thin and often distributed under the name of "Shiraito firefly bukuro".

The garden variety name Campanula takesimana'Kent Belle'is a hybrid of Takeshimana and Campanula latifolia, with bright purple flowers. In many cases, it is distributed under the names of "purple firefly bukuro(紫ホタルブクロ)" and "blue flower firefly bukuro(青花ホタルブクロ)" together with "Sarastro".

Campanula takesimana, which is distributed on the Korean Peninsula and features thick, shiny leaves with few hairs and sharp serrations, and "purple firefly bukuro" with purple flowers. And'Sarastro'and'Kent Belle', which are distributed under the name of "Aoba Firefly Bukro", can be treated in the same way.
 In Korea, it is called Cholong ggot, which means Lantern Flower.

 The flower is also cultivated as an ornamental in the United States.

Habitat and ecology
It is often found in sunny grasslands and forest edges. From early summer to the first half of summer, many bell-shaped flowers bloom on the stem. The thin sub-stem grows and grows, and the flowering strain withers leaving seeds and a large number of offspring. The child stock becomes the parent stock in 1 to 2 years. It is a tough, easy-to-use plant.</ref>

Morphology
It has upright stems which grow with stolons. Basal leaves are long, ovate and heart-shaped. Leaves on flowering stems are rosettes, short and ovate. They are alternate and toothed. It has hair on its full body, including flowers, stems, and leaves.

Flowers

Flowers bloom in June – August. They are tubular and drooping bell-shaped. The colors range from white to pale pink. There are red spots inside of the flower along with hairs. 
It is a hermaphrodite flower, meaning it has both male and female organs, stamen and pistil.

Usage
The flowers and leaves are edible, having a sweet taste. They are used as medicinal herbs in parts of Asia.

References

External links

USDA Plants Profile

punctata